Kinan (also Romanized as Kīnān) is a village in Bajgan Rural District, Aseminun District, Manujan County, Kerman Province, Iran. At the 2006 census its population was 89 in 21 families.

References 

Populated places in Manujan County